Samantha Pankey (born August 6, 1983) is an American rugby union player. She was named in the Eagles 2017 Women's Rugby World Cup squad.

Early career 
Pankey attended Buckingham County High School and played basketball, softball and volleyball. She went to East Carolina University where she did a double major in English/Creative writing and Communication/Journalism. She began her rugby career in 2009 after a friend introduced her to the sport.

She currently plays for the San Diego Surfers and previously played for the James River R.F.C, the Washington Furies and the Scion Sirens.

References

External links 
 USA Rugby Profile

1983 births
Living people
United States women's international rugby union players
American female rugby union players
Female rugby union players
21st-century American women